Hạ Long Bay or Halong Bay is a UNESCO World Heritage Site and popular travel destination in Quảng Ninh Province, Vietnam. The name Hạ Long means "descending dragon". Administratively, the bay belongs to Hạ Long city, Cẩm Phả city, and is a part of Vân Đồn district. The bay features thousands of limestone karsts and isles in various shapes and sizes. Hạ Long Bay is a center of a larger zone which includes Bai Tu Long Bay to the northeast, and Cát Bà Island to the southwest. These larger zones share a similar geological, geographical, geomorphological, climate, and cultural characters.

The limestone in this bay has gone through 500 million years of formation in different conditions and environments. The evolution of the karst in this bay has taken 20 million years under the impact of the tropical wet climate. The geo-diversity of the environment in the area has created biodiversity, including a tropical evergreen biosystem, oceanic and sea shore biosystem. Hạ Long Bay is home to 14 endemic floral species and 60 endemic faunal species.

Historical research surveys have shown the presence of prehistoric human beings in this area tens of thousands years ago. The successive ancient cultures are the Soi Nhụ culture around 18,000–7,000 BC, the Cái Bèo culture 7,000–5,000 BC and the Hạ Long culture 5,000–3,500 years ago. Hạ Long Bay also marked some important events in Vietnamese history, with many artifacts found in Bài Thơ mountain, Đầu Gỗ cave, and Bãi Cháy.

500 years ago, Nguyễn Trãi praised the beauty of Hạ Long Bay in his verse Lộ nhập Vân Đồn, in which he called it "rock wonder in the sky". In 1962, the Ministry of Culture, Sports and Tourism of North Vietnam listed Hạ Long Bay in the National Relics and Landscapes publication. In 1994, the core zone of Hạ Long Bay was listed as a World Heritage Site under Criterion VII, and was listed for a second time under Criterion VIII.

Etymology
The name Hạ Long (chữ Hán: 下龍) means "descending dragon".

Before the 19th century, the name Hạ Long Bay had not been recorded in the old books of the country. It has been called An Bang, Lục Thủy, Vân Đồn ... In the late 19th century, the name Hạ Long Bay appeared on the Maritime Map of France. The French-language Hai Phong News reported "Dragon appears on Hạ Long Bay".

According to local legend, when Vietnam had just started to develop into a country, they had to fight against invaders. To assist the Vietnamese in defending their country, the gods sent a family of dragons as protectors. This family of dragons began spitting out jewels and jade. These jewels turned into the islands and islets dotting the bay, linking together to form a great wall against the invaders. Under magics, numerous rock mountains abruptly appeared on the sea, ahead of invaders' ships; the forward ships struck the rocks and each other. After winning the battle, the dragons were interested in peaceful sightseeing of the Earth, and then decided to live in this bay. The place where the mother dragon descended was named Hạ Long, the place where the dragon's children attended upon their mother was called Bái Tử Long island (Bái: attend upon, Tử: children, Long: dragon), and the place where the dragon's children wriggled their tails violently was called Bạch Long Vĩ island (Bạch: white-color of the foam made when Dragon's children wriggled, Long: dragon, Vĩ: tail), present-day Tra Co peninsula, Móng Cái.

Overview

The bay consists of a dense cluster of some 1,600 limestone monolithic islands each topped with thick jungle vegetation, rising spectacularly from the ocean. Several of the islands are hollow, with enormous caves. Hang Dau Go (Wooden Stakes cave) is the largest grotto in the Hạ Long area. French tourists visited in the late 19th century, and named the cave Grotte des Merveilles. Its three large chambers contain large numerous stalactites and stalagmites (as well as 19th-century French graffiti). There are two bigger islands, Tuần Châu and Cát Bà, that have permanent inhabitants, as well as tourist facilities including hotels and beaches. There are a number of beautiful beaches on the smaller islands.

A community of around 1,600 people live on Hạ Long Bay in four fishing villages: Cua Van, Ba Hang, Cong Tau and Vong Vieng in Hung Thang ward, Hạ Long city. They live on floating houses and are sustained through fishing and marine aquaculture (cultivating marine biota), plying the shallow waters for 200 species of fish and 450 different kinds of mollusks. Many of the islands have acquired their names as a result of interpretation of their unusual shapes. Such names include Voi Islet (elephant), Ga Choi Islet (fighting cock), Khi Islet (monkey), and Mai Nha Islet (roof). 989 of the islands have been given names. Birds and animals including bantams, antelopes, monkeys, and lizard also live on some of the islands.

Another specific feature of Hạ Long Bay is the abundance of lakes inside the limestone islands. For example, Dau Be island has six enclosed lakes. All these island lakes occupy drowned dolines within fengcong karst.

Location
Hạ Long Bay is located in northeastern Vietnam, from E106°55' to E107°37' and from N20°43' to N21°09'. The bay stretches from Quang Yen town, past Hạ Long city, Cẩm Phả city to Vân Đồn District, is 
bordered on the south and southeast by Lan Ha Bay, on the north by Hạ Long city, and on the west by Bai Tu Long Bay. The area designated by UNESCO as the World Natural Heritage Site incorporates  with 775 islets, of which the core zone is delimited by 69 points: Dau Go island on the west, Ba Ham lake on the south and Cong Tay island on the east. The protected area is from the Cái Dăm petrol store to Quang Hanh ward, Cẩm Phả city and the surrounding zone.

Climate
The climate of the bay is tropical, wet, sea islands, with two seasons: hot and moist summer, dry and cold winter. Hạ Long Bay has the typical diurnal tide system (tide amplitude ranges from ). The salinity is from 31 to 34.5MT in the dry season and lower in the rainy season.

Population
Of the 1,969 islands in Hạ Long, only approximately 40 are inhabited. These islands range from tens to thousands of hectares in size, mainly in the East and Southeast of Hạ Long Bay. In recent decades, thousands of villagers have been starting to settle down on the pristine islands and build new communities such as Sa Tô Island (Hạ Long City), Thắng Lợi Island (Vân Đồn district).

The population of Hạ Long Bay is about 1,540, mainly in Cửa Vạn, Ba Hang and Cặp Dè fishing villages (Hùng Thắng Ward, Hạ Long City). Residents of the bay mostly live on boats and rafts buoyed by tires and plastic jugs to facilitate the fishing, cultivating and breeding of aquatic and marine species. Fish require feeding every other day for up to three years, when they are eventually sold to local seafood restaurants for up to 300,000 Vietnamese dong per kilogram. Today the life of Hạ Long Bay inhabitants has much improved due to new travel businesses. Residents of the floating villages around the Hạ Long Bay now offer bedrooms for rent, boat tours, and fresh seafood meals to tourists. While this is an isolating, back-breaking lifestyle, floating village residents are considered wealthy to residents of other Hạ Long Bay islands.

At present , the Quảng Ninh provincial government has a policy to relocate the households living in the bay to resettle, in order to stabilize their life and to protect the landscape of the heritage zone. More than 300 households living in fishing villages in Hạ Long Bay have been relocated ashore in Khe Cá Resettlement Area, now known as Zone 8 (Hà Phong Ward, Hạ Long City) since May 2014. This project will continue to be implemented. The province will only retain a number of fishing villages for sightseeing tours.

History

Soi Nhụ culture (16,000–5000 BC)
Located within Hạ Long and Bái Tử Long are archaeological sites such as Mê Cung and Thiên Long. There are remains from mounds of mountain shellfish (Cyclophorus), spring shellfish (Melania, also called Thiana), some fresh water mollusc and some rudimentary labour tools. The main way of life of Soi Nhụ's inhabitants included catching fish and shellfish, collecting fruits and digging for bulbs and roots. Their living environment was a coastal area unlike other Vietnamese cultures, for example, like those found in Hòa Bình and Bắc Sơn.

Cái Bèo culture (5000–3000 BC)
Located in Hạ Long and Cát Bà island, its inhabitants developed to the level of sea exploitation. Cái Bèo culture is a link between Soi Nhụ culture and Hạ Long culture.

Hạ Long culture (2500–1500 BC)

Classical period 

Hạ Long Bay was the setting for historical naval battles against Vietnam's coastal neighbors. On three occasions, in the labyrinth of channels in Bạch Đằng River near the islands, the Vietnamese army stopped the Chinese invaders from landing. In 1288, General Trần Hưng Đạo stopped Mongol ships from sailing up the nearby Bạch Đằng River by placing steel-tipped wooden stakes at high tide, sinking the Mongol Kublai Khan's fleet.

Modern period 

Hạ Long Bay was the site of the first ever raising of the new national flag of the Provisional Central Government of Vietnam on 5 June 1948 during the signing of the Halong Bay Agreements (Accords de la baie d’Along) by High Commissioner Emile Bollaert and President Nguyễn Văn Xuân.

During the Vietnam War, many of the channels between the islands were heavily mined by the United States Navy, some of which continue to pose threats to shipping routes in the present day.

Geology and geomorphology

In 2000, UNESCO's World Heritage Committee inscribed Hạ Long Bay in the World Heritage List according to its outstanding examples representing major stages of the Earth's history and its original limestone karstic geomorphologic features. Hạ Long Bay and its adjacent areas consist of a part of the Sino-Vietnamese composite terrane having its development history from pre-Cambrian up to present day. During Phanerozoic, terrigenous, volcanogenic and cherty-carbonate sediments containing in abundance graptolites, brachiopods, fishes, corals, foraminiferans, radiolarias, bivalves and flora, separated one from another by 10 stratigraphic gaps, but the boundary between Devonian and Carboniferous has been considered as continuous. The limestone karstic geomorphology of the bay was developed since Miocene, especially the cone-shaped hills (fengcong), or isolated high limestone karst towers (fenglin) with many remnants of old phreatic caves, old karstic foot caves, marine notch caves form magnificent limestone karst landforms as unique on the world. The Quaternary geology was developed through 5 cycles with the intercalation of marine and continental environments. The present Hạ Long Bay, in fact, appeared after the Middle Holocene maximum transgression, leaving ultimate zone of lateral undercutting in the limestone cliffs bearing many shells of oysters, having the 14C age as 2280 to >40,000 y. BP. Geological resources are abundant: anthracite, lignite, oil shale, petroleum, phosphate, limestone and cement additives, kaolin, silica sand, dolomite, quartzite of exogenous origin, and antimony, mercury of hydrothermal origin. Besides, there still are surface water, groundwater and thermal mineral water on the shore of the Hạ Long – Bái Tử Long Bays and other environmental resources.

In terms of marine geology, this area is recorded as an especially coastal sedimentary environment. In the alkaline seawater environment, the chemical denudation process of calcium carbonate proceeds rapidly, creating wide, strangely shaped marine notches.

The bottom surface sediments are various from clay mud to sand, however, silty mud and clay mud are dominated in distribution. Especially, the carbonate materials originated from organisms make up from 60 to 65% sedimentary content. The surface sediments of coral reefs are mainly sand and pebbles of which the carbonate materials occupy for more than 90%. The intertidal zone sediments are various from clay mud to sand and gravel depending to distinguished sedimentary environments such as mangrove marshes, tidal flats, beaches etc. At the small, but wonderfully beautiful beaches,  the sand sediments may be dominated quartz or carbonate materials.

The sediment layers of intertidal zone, the upper sea bed with a plain surface conserving ancient rivers, systems of caves and its sediments, traces of ancient marine action forming distinctive notches, beaches and marine terraces, mangrove swamps are important evidence of geological events and processes taking place during Quaternary.

History of tectonics
Hạ Long Bay has experienced at least 500 million years in various geological states of orogeny, marine transgression and marine regression. During the Ordovician and Silurian periods (500-410 million years ago), Hạ Long Bay was deep sea. During the Carboniferous and Permian periods (340-250 million years ago), Hạ Long Bay was at shallow sea level.

The dominated uplift movement of neotectonic and recent tectonic influenced deeply on topography of this area, and the present landscape of sea-islands was formed around 7 or 8 thousand years ago by the sea invasion during Holocene transgression begun at about 17–18 thousand years ago. Particularly from the Holocene time, from about 11,000 years ago Cat Ba – Hạ Long area has much archaeological evidence connecting variations in sea levels with the development of ancient cultures such as the Soi Nhu and Hạ Long cultures.

Karst geomorphology value

Due to a simultaneous combination of ideal factors such as thick, pale, grey, and strong limestone layers, which are formed by fine-grained materials; hot and moist climate and slow tectonic process as a whole; Hạ Long Bay has had a complete karst evolution for 20 million years. There are many types of karst topography in the bay, such as karst field.

Hạ Long Bay is a mature karst landscape developed during a warm, wet, tropical climate. The sequence of stages in the evolution of a karst landscape over a period of 20 million years requires a combination of several distinct elements including a massive thickness of limestone, a hot wet climate and slow overall tectonic up lift. The process of karst formation is divided into five stages, the second of which is the formation of the distinctive do line karst. This is followed by the development of fengcong karst, which can be seen in the groups of hills on Bo Hon and Dau Be Inland. These cones with sloping sides average 100m in height with the tallest exceeding 200m. Fenglin karst is characterised by steep separate towers. The hundreds of rocky islands with form the beautiful and famous landscape of the Bay are the individual towers of a classic Fenglin landscape where the intervening plains have been submerged by the sea. Most towers reach a height of between 50 and 100m with a height to width ratio of about 6. The karst dolines were flooded by the sea, becoming the abundance of lakes that lie within the limestone islands. For example, Dau Be island at the mouth of the Bay has six enclosed lakes including those of the Ba Ham lakes lying within its fengcong karst. The Bay contains examples of the landscape elements of fengcong, fenglin and karst plain. These are not separate evolutionary stages but the result of natural non – uniform processes in the denudation of a large mass of limestone. Marine erosion created the notches which in some places have been enlarged into caves. The marine notch is a feature of limestone coastline but, in Hạ Long Bay, it has created the mature landscape.

Within Hạ Long Bay, the main accessible caves are the older passages that survive from the time when the karst was evolving though its various stages of fengcong and fenglin. Three main types of caves can be recognized in the limestone islands (Waltham, T. 1998):
Remnants of old phreatic caves
Old karstic foot caves
Marine notch caves

The first group consists of old phreatic caves which include Sung Sot, Tam Cung, Lau Dai, Thien Cung, Dau Go, Hoang Long, Thien Long. Nowadays, these caves lie at various high levels. Sung Sot cave is on Bo Hon island. From its truncated entrance chambers on a ledge high on the cliff, a passage of more than 10m high and wide descends to the south. Tam Cung is a large phreatic fissure cave that developed in the bedding planes of the limestone dividing the fissure cave into three chambers. Lau Dai is a cave with a complex of passages extending over 300m opening on the south side of Con Ngua island. Thien Cung and Dau Go are remnants of the same old cave system. They both survive in the northern part of Dau Go island at between 20 and 50m above sea level. Thien Cung has one large chamber more than 100m long, blocked at its ends and almost subdivided into smaller chambers by massive wall of stalactites and stalagmites. Dau Go is a single large tunnel descending along a major set of fractures to a massive choke.

The second group of caves is the old karstic foot caves which include Trinh Lu, Bo Nau, Tien Ong and Trong caves. Foot caves are a ubiquitous feature of karst landscapes which have reached a stage of widespread lateral undercutting at base level. They may extend back into maze caves of stream caves draining from larger cave systems within the limestone. They are distinguished by the main elements of their passages being close to the horizontal and are commonly related to denuded or accumulated terraces at the old base levels. Trinh Nu, which is one of the larger foot caves in Hạ Long Bay with its ceiling at about 12m above sea level and about 80m in length, was developed in multiple stages. Bo Nau, a horizontal cave containing old stalactite deposits, cuts across the 25o dip of the bedding plane.

The third group is the marine notch caves that are a special feature of the karst of Hạ Long Bay. The dissolution process of sea water acting on the limestone and erosion by wave action crates notches at the base of the cliffs. In advantageous conditions, dissolution of the limestone allows the cliff notches to be steadily deepened and extended into caves. Many of these at sea level extend right though the limestone hills into drowned dolines which are now tidal lakes.

A distinguishing feature of marine notch caves is an absolutely smooth and horizontal ceiling cut through the limestone. Some marine notch caves had been not formed at present sea level, but old sea levels related to sea level changes in Holocene transgression, event to Pleistocene sea levels. Some of them passed preserved the development of old karstic foot cave in mainland environment or preserved the remnants of older phreatic caves. One of the most unusual features of Hạ Long Bay is the Bo Ham lake group of hidden lakes and their connecting tunnel – notch caves in Dau Be island. From the island's perimeter cliff a cave, 10m wide at water level and curving so that it is almost completely dark, extends about 150m to Lake 1. Luon cave is on Bo Hon island and extends 50m though to an enclosed tidal lake. It has a massive stalactite hanging 2m down and truncated at the modern tidal level. It has passed through many stages in its formation.

The karst landscape of Hạ Long Bay is of international significance and of fundamental importance to the science of geomorphology. The fenglin tower karst, which is the type present in much of Hạ Long Bay, is the most extreme form of limestone landscape development. If these karst landscapes are broadly compared in terms of their height, steepness and number of their limestone towers, Hạ Long Bay is probably second in the entire world only to Yangshou, in China. However, Hạ Long Bay has also been invaded by the sea so that the geomorphology of its limestone islands are, at least in part, the consequence of marine erosion. The marine invasion distinguishes Hạ Long Bay and makes it unique in the world. There are other areas of submerged karst towers which were invaded by the sea, but none is as extensive as Hạ Long Bay.

Timeline of geologic evolution
Some of the most remarkable geological events in Hạ Long Bay's history have occurred in the last 1,000 years, include the advance of the sea, the raising of the bay area, strong erosion that has formed coral, and, pure blue and heavily salted water. This process of erosion by seawater has deeply engraved the stone, contributing to its fantastic beauty. Present-day Hạ Long Bay is the result of this long process of geological evolution that has been influenced by so many factors.

Due to all these factors, tourists visiting Hạ Long Bay are not only treated to one of the natural wonders of the world, but also to a precious geological museum that has been naturally preserved in the open air for the last 300 million years.

Ecology
Two ecosystems coexist in Ha Long Bay: a tropical, moist, evergreen rainforest ecosystem and a marine and coastal ecosystem. Livistona halongensis, Impatiens halongensis, Chirita halongensis, Chirita hiepii, Chirita modesta, Paraboea halongensis, and Alpinia calcicola are among the seven endemic species found in the bay. There is also bioluminescent plankton..

The many islands that dot the bay are home to a great many other species, including (but likely not limited to): 477 magnoliales, 12 pteris, 20 salt marsh flora; and 4 amphibia, 10 reptilia, 40 aves, and 4 mammalia.

Common aquatic species found in the bay include: cuttlefish (mực); oyster (hào); cyclinae (ngán); prawns (penaeidea (tôm he), panulirus (tôm hùm), parapenaeopsis (tôm sắt), etc.); sipunculoideas (sá sùng); nerita (ốc đĩa); charonia tritonis (ốc tù và); and cà sáy.

Environmental damage
With an increasing tourist trade, mangroves and seagrass beds have been cleared and jetties and wharves have been built for tourist boats.

Game fishing, often near coral reefs, is threatening many endangered species of fish.

Local government and businesses are aware of the problems and many measures have been taken to minimise the impact of tourism on the bay environment for sustainable economic growth like introducing eco-friendly tours and introducing tight waste control on resorts.

Awards and designations
In 1962, the Vietnam Ministry of Culture, Sport and Tourism designated Hạ Long Bay a 'Renowned National Landscape Monument'.

Hạ Long Bay was first listed as a UNESCO World Heritage Site in 1994, in recognition of its outstanding, universal aesthetic value. In 2000, the World Heritage Committee additionally recognised Hạ Long Bay for its outstanding geological and geomorphological value, and its World Heritage Listing was updated.

In October 2011, the World Monuments Fund included the bay on the 2012 World Monuments Watch, citing pressure from tourism and associated developments as threats to the site that must be addressed.

In 2012, the New 7 Wonders Foundation officially named Hạ Long Bay as one of the New 7 Wonders of Nature.

Hạ Long Bay is also a part of the Club of the Most Beautiful Bays of the World.

Popular culture

Literature
In writings about Hạ Long Bay, the following Vietnamese writers wrote:
 Nguyễn Trãi: "This wonder is ground raising up into the middle of the high sky".
 Xuân Diệu: "Here is the unfinished works of the Beings...Here is the stones which the Giant played and threw away".
 Nguyên Ngọc: "...to form this first- rate wonder, nature only uses: Stone and Water...There are just only two materials themselves chosen from as much as materials, in order to write, to draw, to sculpture, to create everything...It is quite possible that here is the image of the future world".
 Ho Chi Minh: "It is the wonder that one cannot impart to others".
 Phạm Văn Đồng: "Is it one scenery or many sceneries? Is it the scenery in the world or somewhere?".
 Nguyễn Tuân: "Only mountains accept to be old, but Hạ Long sea and wave are young forever".
 Huy Cận: "Night breathes, stars wave Hạ Long's water".
 Chế Lan Viên:
"Hạ Long, Bái Tử Long - Dragons were hidden, only stones still remain
On the moonlight nights, stones meditate as men do..."
Lord Trịnh Cương overflowed with emotion: "Mountains are glistened by water shadow, water spills all over the sky".

Ancient tales

The inhabitants of the bay and its adjacent city have transmitted numerous ancient tales explaining names given to various isles and caves in the bay.
 Đầu Gỗ cave ("the end of wooden bars" cave): these wooden bars in this cave are the remnants of sharped wooden columns built under the water level by the order of Trần Hưng Đạo commander in order to sink Mongolian invaders' ships in the 13th century.
 Kim Quy cave ("Golden Turtle" cave): it is told that the Golden Turtle swam toward the Eastern Sea (international name: South China Sea) after returning the holy sword which had assisted King Lê Thái Tổ in the combat against Ming invaders from China. Next, with the approval of the Sea King, Golden Turtle continued to fight against monsters in this marine area. The turtle became exhausted and died in a cave. Consequently, the cave was named after the Golden Turtle.
 Con Cóc islet (Frog islet): a frog-like isle. According to ancient tales, in a year of severe drought, a frog directed all animals to the Heaven and protested against the God. They demonstrated in favour of making rain. As a result, the God must accept the frog as his uncle. Since then, whenever frogs grind their teeth, the God has to pour water down the ground.
 Hang Trống and Hang Trinh Nữ (Male cave and Virgin cave): the tale's about a beautiful woman had fallen in love with a fisherman whom must sail to the sea not so long after their engagement, the landlord saw this beautiful girl and captured her, but with her resistance, the landlord exiled the girl to remote island. After being left to starve, the girl died and turned into a statue people called Hang Trinh Nữ (Virgin Cave). Her betrothed ran to the girl's island and when he found out what had happened, he turned into an islet situated nearby called Hang Trống (Male cave).
 Thiên Cung cave (literally: Paradise cave): this cave is one of the places associated with the ancient dragon king. It told that Thiên Cung cave was the place where the Dragon King's seven-day marriage took place. To congratulate the couple, many dragons and elephants visited to dance and fly.

Video games
Hạ Long Bay appears in the 2016 video game Civilization VI's "Khmer and Indonesia Civilization & Scenario Pack" as a Natural Wonder. In addition to providing Food, Production and Culture, it strengthens Naval units' defense while within its area.

See also
Guilin
Krabi
Matsushima

References

External links

 Official website
UNESCO's World Heritage Convention: Hạ Long Bay*
The Emerald Isles of Hạ Long Bay at NASA Earth Observatory, May 7, 2022
 Environmental capacity Hạ Long Bay – Bai Tu Long. Publisher: Natural Science and Technology. Hanoi. Editor: Nguyen Khoa Son,  – in Vietnamese
 Vietnamese Sea and Islands – position Resources, and typical geological and ecological wonders. Publisher Science and Technology. Ha Noi, Editor: Nguyen Khoa Son, – in Vietnamese

Articles containing video clips
ASEAN heritage parks
Bays of Vietnam
Fishing communities in Vietnam
Gulf of Tonkin
Landforms of Quảng Ninh province
Places with bioluminescence
Tourist attractions in Quảng Ninh province
World Heritage Sites in Vietnam